The History of Mr. Polly is a 1949 British film based on the 1910 comic novel The History of Mr. Polly by H.G. Wells. It was directed by Anthony Pelissier (who is also credited with the script) and stars John Mills, Betty Ann Davies, Megs Jenkins, Moore Marriott and Finlay Currie. It was the first adaptation of one of Wells's works to be produced after his death in 1946.

Plot
Following his dismissal from a draper's shop, where his father had placed him as an apprentice, protagonist Alfred Polly (John Mills) finds it hard to find another position. When a telegram arrives informing him of his father's death, he returns to the family home.

With a bequest of £500, Polly considers his future; and a friend of his father's, Mr Johnsen (Edward Chapman), urges him to invest it in a shop - an idea that Polly dislikes. Whilst dawdling in the country on a newly-bought bicycle, Polly has a brief dalliance with a schoolgirl, Christabel (Sally Ann Howes); but later marries one of his cousins, Miriam Larkins (Betty Ann Davies). Fifteen years later, Polly and his wife are running a draper's shop in Fishbourne, and the marriage has descended to incessant arguments and bickering.

While walking in the country, Polly decides to commit suicide. He sets his shop ablaze in the hope that the insurance will assure Miriam's prosperity. However, he botches the arson job and, instead of killing himself, rescues an elderly neighbour and becomes a minor local celebrity.

Still unhappy, Polly leaves his wife and is hired by a rural innkeeper (Megs Jenkins) as handyman and ferryman; however, he soon realises that the position was only open because the innkeeper's brother-in-law Jim (Finlay Currie) is a drunkard who bullies any other man to leave the inn. Polly clashes with him until the latter accidentally drowns in a weir while chasing Polly. Three years later, Polly returns to Fishbourne to find Miriam operating a tea-shop with her sister in the belief that Polly has drowned, and he returns to his happier life at the inn.

Cast

John Mills as Alfred Polly
Betty Ann Davies as Miriam Larkins
Megs Jenkins as The Innkeeper
Finlay Currie as Uncle Jim
Gladys Henson as Aunt Larkins
Diana Churchill as Annie Larkins
Shelagh Fraser as Minnie Larkins
Edward Chapman as Mr. Johnson
Dandy Nichols as Mrs. Johnson
Sally Ann Howes as Christabel
Juliet Mills as Little Polly
Laurence Baskcomb as Mr. Rumbold
Edie Martin as Lady on roof
Moore Marriott as Uncle Pentstemon
David Horne as Mr. Garvace
Ernest Jay as Mr. Hinks
Cyril Smith as Mr. Voules
Wylie Watson as Mr. Rusper
Jay Laurier as Mr. Boomer

Critical reception
At the time of its release, Variety wrote "Faithful adherence to the original H. G. Wells story is one of the main virtues of The History of Mr Polly," with the reviewer concluding that "Director Anthony Pelissier has put all the emphasis on the principal characters, and has extracted every ounce of human interest from the classic. Every part, right down to the smallest bit, has been selected with care and there is some notable work from an experienced cast."

References

External links 

 

1949 films
British black-and-white films
Films set in Sussex
Films shot at Denham Film Studios
British drama films
Films based on works by H. G. Wells
Films directed by Anthony Pelissier
Films scored by William Alwyn
Films based on British novels
1949 drama films
1940s English-language films
1940s British films